Puppets of Fate is a 1921 American silent drama film directed by Dallas M. Fitzgerald and starring Viola Dana, Francis McDonald, and Jackie Saunders.

Cast
 Viola Dana as Sorrentina Palombra 
 Francis McDonald as Gabriel Palombra 
 Jackie Saunders as 'Babe' Reynolds 
 Fred Kelsey as Bobs 
 Tom Ricketts as Father Francesco 
 Edgar Kennedy as Mike Reynolds

References

Bibliography
 Donald W. McCaffrey & Christopher P. Jacobs. Guide to the Silent Years of American Cinema. Greenwood Publishing, 1999.

External links
 

1921 films
1921 drama films
1920s English-language films
American silent feature films
Silent American drama films
Films directed by Dallas M. Fitzgerald
American black-and-white films
Metro Pictures films
1920s American films